The At-Taqwa Mosque is a mosque in Dayuan District, Taoyuan City, Taiwan. It is the seventh mosque built in Taiwan.

History
The mosque development was started by an Indonesian-Taiwanese couple who own an Indonesian shop around the area where most of the Indonesian workers work at the factories or in households. They purchased empty land beside their shop to build a mosque. With the help of funding and lending from various organizations, the mosque could finally be constructed a year later. The mosque was officially opened on 9 June 2013. On 24 April 2016, the Taiwan Muslim Association (TMA) was established and headquartered at the mosque.

Activities
Beside hosting the normal five compulsory daily prayers for Muslims, the mosque also regularly holds classes, such as Mandarin language. The mosque also hosts the branch office of the Zakat foundation Dompet Peduli Ummat Daarut Tauhiid (DPU DT) in early 2017. It is also the headquarters of the Taiwan Muslim Association.

Architecture

This 130 square metre mosque is 26 meters in length and five meters in width. The building consists of three stories, in which the first story is dedicated for the male prayer hall, the second story is for the female prayer hall and guest room, and the third floor is for classes and dormitories.

Transportation
At-Taqwa Mosque is accessible north west from Dayuan Station of the Taoyuan Metro.

See also
 Islam in Taiwan
 Chinese Muslim Association
 Chinese Muslim Youth League
 List of mosques in Taiwan
 Indonesians in Taiwan

References

External links

 Facebook - MASJID AT-TAQWA DAYUAN

2013 establishments in Taiwan
Taqwa Mosque
Taqwa Mosque